Buccinum pulchellum is a species of sea snail, a marine gastropod mollusk in the family Buccinidae, the true whelks.

Not to be confounded with:
 Buccinum pulchellum Blainville, 1829: synonym of Zafrona pulchella (Blainville, 1829)
 Buccinum pulchellum Calcara, 1845: synonym of Mazatlania cosentini (Philippi, 1836)
 Buccinum pulchellum C. B. Adams, 1851: synonym of Decipifus sixaolus Olsson & McGinty, 1958

Description

Distribution
This marine species occurs in European waters.

References

External links
  Sars, G.O. (1878). Bidrag til Kundskaben om Norges arktiske Fauna. I. Mollusca Regionis Arcticae Norvegiae. Oversigt over de i Norges arktiske Region Forekommende Bløddyr. Brøgger, Christiania. xiii + 466 pp., pls 1–34 & I-XVIII

Buccinidae
Gastropods described in 1878